"Gossip Calypso" is a novelty calypso song written by Trevor Peacock. It was recorded by Bernard Cribbins and released by EMI on the Parlophone label in 1962. The musical accompaniment was directed by Johnnie Spence, and the producer was George Martin. It reached number 23 in the UK Singles Chart, and was Cribbins' third top 30 hit of the year. 

The lyrics repeat the conversations between several female neighbours describing the latest news of themselves, their families and other neighbours, joined by the chorus:

The slang used and names and situations mentioned imply the neighbours are in Britain rather than the Caribbean. The song is part of the early 1960s British calypso craze.

References

1962 songs
1962 singles
Bernard Cribbins songs
Calypso songs
Novelty songs
Parlophone singles
Song recordings produced by George Martin